Eurymedon the Hierophant was a representative of the priestly clan overseeing the Eleusinian Mysteries. Together with Demophilus he reportedly brought a charge of impiety against Aristotle after Alexander the Great's death in 323 BC.

References

4th-century BC Athenians
Aristotle
Eleusinian hierophants
4th-century BC clergy